Flavio is an opera in three acts by George Frideric Handel.

Flavio may also refer to the following:

Aircraft
Quasar Flavio, a Czech hang glider design

People
Flavio (name), Italian and Spanish given name
Flávio, Portuguese given name
Flávio Amado, Angolan footballer
Flavio Briatore, Italian businessman
Flavio Barros, Brazilian footballer
Flavio Biondo, Italian Renaissance humanist historian
Flávio Canto, Brazilian judoka
Flavio Cipolla, Italian tennis player
Flavio Cotti, Swiss politician
Flávio Conceição, Brazilian footballer
Flavio Delbono, Italian economist and politician
Flavio Maestri, Peruvian footballer
Flávio Meireles, Portuguese footballer
Flávio Saretta, Brazilian tennis player